The Frauen SHV-Cup is an annual single-elimination tournament for Swiss women's handball clubs organized by the Swiss Handball Federation (SHV). It was created in 2000.

LC Brühl is the most successful team in the competition with eight titles, followed by Spono Nottwil with three and TSV Saint Othmar with two.

Finals

References

Handball competitions in Switzerland
Recurring sporting events established in 2000
Handball